Kermes vermilio is a species of Kermes so which feeds on trees. Some of the species are used by humans to make vermilion; though an at-similar-time-of-discovery mineral form in many cultures is cinnabar (HgS, Mercury Sulphide, crystallized). For details of further chemical alternatives see vermilion.

Sister species

The word (and dye) crimson is a corruption-derivative of kermes – the organism's genus, chiefly referring to its other species.

See also
Cochineal
Armenian cochineal (kirmiz)
Vermilion

References

Insects described in 1864
Animal dyes
Kermesidae